Phasmatocoris is a little-known genus of thread-legged bug (Emesinae). Fourteen species have been described, including 3 from Colombia.

Partial species list
Phasmatocoris labyrinthicus Pape, 2013
Phasmatocoris magdalenae Wygodzinsky
Phasmatocoris moraballi Wygodzinsky
Phasmatocoris spectrum Breddin, 1904
Phasmatocoris sturmi Wygodzinsky
Phasmatocoris usingeri Wygodzinsky, 1966
Phasmatocoris xavieri Gil-Santana 2007

References

Reduviidae
Cimicomorpha genera
Insects of South America